The 1912–13 RPI men's ice hockey season was the 10th season of play for the program.

Season
After showing some signs of life the year before, Rensselaer sank back to the bottom of the standings, losing all four of their games.

Note: Rensselaer's athletic teams were unofficially known as 'Cherry and White' until 1921 when the Engineers moniker debuted for the men's basketball team.

Roster

Standings

Schedule and Results

|-
!colspan=12 style=";" | Regular Season

References

RPI Engineers men's ice hockey seasons
RPI
RPI
RPI
RPI